Kagg may refer to:

 KAGG, American radio station
 KAGG (law), set of German regulations
 Lars Kagg (1595–1661), Swedish nobleman